Point Blank is a global network of music production schools founded in London in 1994 by musician and producer Robert Cowan, offering a variety of courses in electronic music production, sound engineering, DJing, singing, songwriting, radio broadcasting, and music business. In addition to its original location in Hoxton, North London, Point Blank now has schools in Los Angeles, Ibiza, Mumbai, Hangzhou, Shenzhen, and online.

History 
Point Blank started as a recording studio in Greenwich, London in 1994. Founder and CEO Rob Cowan had previously been a bass player in Sony-signed band Honeychile and worked as a studio engineer for Matrix studios, working with artists such as D:Ream and Blur. Originally set up as a recording studio, Point Blank quickly evolved into a school after clients expressed an interest in learning about how the gear worked themselves. The school eventually relocated to its current location in Hoxton, London where it offers courses on singing, songwriting, radio broadcasting, music business and live sound.

In 2013, the school was banned by the Border Agency from sponsoring non-EU nationals for offering too many places to students who failed to meet the rules. It had previously had 'highly trusted' status for a decade, and the school's managing director blamed the issue on 'formalities and clerical errors on the side of the UKBA.' It was reinstated in the same year after a re-inspection.

In 2015, Point Blank opened a school in Silverlake, Los Angeles. Housed in the historic Mack Sennett Studios, Point Blank's L.A. school provides students with music production and DJ courses, including Music Composition, Complete DJ and Audio Mastering Courses.

Point Blank extended their London campus by opening a second studio complex in 2016. The second premises, also located in Hoxton, features 7 purpose built teaching studios, including DJ and music production equipment such as a SSL Duality Delta mixing desk.

In 2017, Point Blank opened an additional school in San Jose, Ibiza. The school, which is found in Ibiza's Can Blau facility, offers students a DJing and Music Producing hybrid course. In September of the same year, Point Blank announced the launch of a two-week DJ/Entrepreneur course in Mumbai, in collaboration with The True School of Music.

In July 2019, Point Blank opened a school in Hangzhou, China. The school, in partnership with NetEase FEVER, offers courses including music production, DJing, singing & songwriting, music industry and weekend courses.

Notable alumni  
 Goldie - musician / DJ 
 Felix Jaehn - record producer / DJ
 Nicole Moudaber - record producer / DJ
 Claude VonStroke - musician /  DJ
 Leona Lewis - singer / songwriter
 Mishlawi - hip-hop artist
 Alex Gill - xylophone master / singer

Partnerships 
Point Blank is partnered with Middlesex University and offers a BA (Hons) Music Production and Sound Engineering degree with the University. Point Blank is an Ableton Education Partner,
an Apple Inc. Training Centre, Steinberg Training Centre and Native Instruments Training Centre. It has also partnered with Solid State Logic (SSL) since 2016.

Record Label 
Point Blank runs its own in-house record label, Point Blank Recordings, founded to help establish talented students in the music industry.

References

External links
International Site

Educational institutions established in 1994
Audio engineering schools
Music schools in London
1994 establishments in England